Systematic desensitization, or graduated exposure therapy, is a behavior therapy developed by the psychiatrist Joseph Wolpe. It is used when a phobia or anxiety disorder is maintained by classical conditioning. It shares the same elements of both cognitive-behavioral therapy and applied behavior analysis. When used in applied behavior analysis, it is based on radical behaviorism as it incorporates counterconditioning principles. These include meditation (a private behavior or covert conditioning) and breathing (a public behavior or overt conditioning). From the cognitive psychology perspective, cognitions and feelings precede behavior, so it initially uses cognitive restructuring.

The goal of the therapy is for the individual to learn how to cope with and overcome their fear in each level of an exposure hierarchy. The process of systematic desensitization occurs in three steps. The first step is to identify the hierarchy of fears. The second step is to learn relaxation or coping techniques. Finally, the individual uses these techniques to manage their fear during a situation from the hierarchy. The third step is repeated for each level of the hierarchy, starting from the least fear-inducing situation.

Three steps of desensitization
There are three main steps that Wolpe identified to successfully desensitize an individual.
Establish anxiety stimulus hierarchy. The individual should first identify the items that are causing the anxiety problems. Each item that causes anxiety is given a subjective ranking on the severity of induced anxiety. If the individual is experiencing great anxiety to many different triggers, each item is dealt with separately. For each trigger or stimulus, a list is created to rank the events from least anxiety-provoking to most anxiety-provoking.
Learn the mechanism response. Relaxation training, such as meditation, is one type of  best coping strategies.  Wolpe taught his patients relaxation responses because it is not possible to be both relaxed and anxious at the same time. In this method, patients practice tensing and relaxing different parts of the body until the patient reaches a state of serenity. This is necessary because it provides the patient with a means of controlling their fear, rather than letting it increase to intolerable levels. Only a few sessions are needed for a patient to learn appropriate coping mechanisms. Additional coping strategies include anti-anxiety medicine and breathing exercises. Another example of relaxation is cognitive reappraisal of imagined outcomes. The therapist might encourage patients to examine what they imagine happening when exposed to the  anxiety-inducing stimulus and then allowing for the client to replace the imagined catastrophic situation with any of the imagined positive outcomes.
Connect stimulus to the incompatible response or coping method by  counter conditioning. In this step the client completely relaxes and is then presented with the lowest item that was placed on their hierarchy of severity of anxiety phobias. When the patient has reached a state of serenity again after being presented with the first stimuli, the second stimuli that should present a higher level of anxiety is presented. This will help the patient overcome their phobia. This activity is repeated until all the items of the hierarchy of severity anxiety is completed without inducing any anxiety in the client at all. If at any time during the exercise the coping mechanisms fail  or became a failure, or the patient fails to complete the coping mechanism due to the severe anxiety, the exercise is then stopped. When the individual is calm, the last stimuli that is presented without inducing anxiety is presented again and the exercise is  then continued depending on the patient outcomes.

Example
A client may approach a therapist due to their great phobia of snakes. This is how the therapist would help the client using the three steps of systematic desensitization:
Establish anxiety stimulus hierarchy. A therapist may begin by asking the patient to identify a fear hierarchy. This fear hierarchy would list the relative unpleasantness of various levels of exposure to a snake. For example, seeing a picture of a snake might elicit a low fear rating, compared to live snakes crawling on the individual—the latter scenario becoming highest on the fear hierarchy.
Learn coping mechanisms or incompatible responses. The therapist would work with the client to learn appropriate coping and relaxation techniques such as meditation and deep muscle relaxation responses.
Connect the stimulus to the incompatible response or coping method. The client would be presented with increasingly unpleasant levels of the feared stimuli, from lowest to highest—while utilizing the deep relaxation techniques (i.e. progressive muscle relaxation) previously learned. The imagined stimuli to help with a phobia of snakes may include: a picture of a snake; a small snake in a nearby room; a snake in full view; touching of the snake, etc. At each step in the imagined progression, the patient is desensitized to the phobia through exposure to the stimulus while in a state of relaxation. As the fear hierarchy is unlearned, anxiety gradually becomes extinguished.

Uses

Specific phobias
Specific phobias are one class of mental disorder often treated via systematic desensitization. When persons experience such phobias (for example fears of heights, dogs, snakes, closed spaces, etc.), they tend to avoid the feared stimuli; this avoidance, in turn, can temporarily reduce anxiety but is not necessarily an adaptive way of coping with it. In this regard, patients' avoidance behaviors can become reinforced – a concept defined by the tenets of operant conditioning. Thus, the goal of systematic desensitization is to overcome avoidance by gradually exposing patients to the phobic stimulus, until that stimulus can be tolerated. Wolpe found that systematic desensitization was successful 90% of the time when treating phobias.

Test anxiety
Between 25 and 40 percent of students experience test anxiety. Children can suffer from low self-esteem and stress-induced symptoms as a result of test anxiety. The principles of systematic desensitization can be used by children to help reduce their test anxiety. Children can practice the muscle relaxation techniques by tensing and relaxing different muscle groups. With older children and college students, an explanation of desensitization can help to increase the effectiveness of the process. After these students learn the relaxation techniques, they can create an anxiety inducing hierarchy. For test anxiety these items could include not understanding directions, finishing on time, marking the answers properly, spending too little time on tasks, or underperforming. Teachers, school counselors or school psychologists could instruct children on the methods of systematic desensitization.

Recent use
Desensitization is widely known as one of the most effective therapy techniques. In recent decades, systematic desensitization has become less commonly used as a treatment of choice for anxiety disorders. Since 1970 academic research on systematic desensitization has declined, and the current focus has been on other therapies. In addition, the number of clinicians using systematic desensitization has also declined since 1980. Those clinicians that continue to regularly use systematic desensitization were trained before 1986. It is believed that the decrease of systematic desensitization by practicing psychologist is due to the increase in other techniques such as flooding, implosive therapy, and participant modeling.

History
In 1947, Wolpe discovered that the cats of Wits University could overcome their fears through gradual and systematic exposure. Wolpe studied Ivan Pavlov's work on artificial neuroses and the research done on elimination of children's fears by Watson and Jones. In 1958, Wolpe did a series of experiments on the artificial induction of neurotic disturbance in cats. He found that gradually deconditioning the neurotic animals was the best way to treat them of their neurotic disturbances. Wolpe deconditioned the neurotic cats through different feeding environments. Wolpe knew that this treatment of feeding would not generalize to humans and he instead substituted relaxation as a treatment to relieve the anxiety symptoms.

Wolpe found that if he presented a client with the actual anxiety inducing stimulus, the relaxation techniques did not work. It was difficult to bring all of the objects into his office because not all anxiety inducing stimuli are physical objects, but instead are concepts. Wolpe instead began to have his clients imagine the anxiety inducing stimulus or look at pictures of the anxiety inducing stimulus, much like the process that is done today.

See also
 Flooding (psychology)
 Immersion therapy
 Sensitization

References

External links
 Self-administered Systematic Desensitization

Anxiety disorder treatment
Behavior therapy
Behaviorism